Woodwardville Historic District is a national historic district at Woodwardville, Anne Arundel County, Maryland.  The district consists of 16 historic structures, most of which are located adjacent to Patuxent Road, which runs through the center of the village of Woodwardville.  The district contains good examples of late-19th and early-20th century domestic architecture, including Bungalow, Foursquare, Tudor Revival, and Queen Anne styles.  The village's development was directly related to the construction of the Baltimore & Potomac Railroad, initiated in 1867 and completed in 1872.

It was listed on the National Register of Historic Places in 2003.

References

External links
, including photo from 2002, at Maryland Historical Trust
Boundary Map of the Woodwardville Historic District, Anne Arundel County, at Maryland Historical Trust

Historic districts on the National Register of Historic Places in Maryland
Historic districts in Anne Arundel County, Maryland
National Register of Historic Places in Anne Arundel County, Maryland